Muramyl dipeptide is constituent of both Gram-positive and Gram-negative bacteria composed of N-acetylmuramic acid linked by its lactic acid moiety to the N-terminus of an L-alanine D-isoglutamine dipeptide.

It can be recognized by the immune system as a pathogen-associated molecular pattern and activate the NALP3 inflammasome  which in turn leads to cytokine activation, especially IL-1α and IL-1β.

See also
 Dipeptide
 Mifamurtide, a synthetic analogue for the treatment of osteosarcoma

References

Peptides
Amino sugars